The John E. and Ruth Hipple House is a historic house located at 219 N. Highland in Pierre, South Dakota. Built in 1913, the Prairie School house features a roof with a low pitch and overhanging eaves, a front porch, and a horizontal emphasis throughout its design. The home was originally owned by John E. and Ruth Hipple, both of whom were prominent Pierre citizens. John served as Pierre's mayor from 1924 to 1939 and owned the Capital Journal, while Ruth was an important figure in the local women's suffrage movement.

The house was added to the National Register of Historic Places on June 6, 2001.

References

Houses on the National Register of Historic Places in South Dakota
Prairie School architecture in South Dakota
Houses completed in 1913
Houses in Pierre, South Dakota
1913 establishments in South Dakota
National Register of Historic Places in Pierre, South Dakota